Victor Sutton (3 December 1935 – 29 July 1999) was a British professional racing cyclist. He rode in the 1959 & 1960 Tour de France.

References

External links
 

1935 births
1999 deaths
British male cyclists
People from Thorne, South Yorkshire
Sportspeople from Doncaster